Bernard Talon (16 June 1930 – 9 March 2022) was a French politician. A member of the Rally for the Republic, he served in the Senate from 1971 to 1980. He died on 9 March 2022, at the age of 91.

References

1930 births
2022 deaths
20th-century French politicians
French Senators of the Fifth Republic
Senators of Territoire de Belfort
Rally for the Republic politicians